During the 1900s in Australia, fencing became more socially acceptable for women to participate in and subsequently female participation rates rose in places like Queensland.

Women's fencing increased in popularity in Australia following the end of World War II and the subsequent immigration of many women from countries where the sport was popular.

At the 2011 Australian championships, in the open women's foil event, Emma Ryan came in first.

Notable people
Joan Beck 
Daphne Ceeney 1964 Summer Paralympics bronze medalist

References

Fencing
Fencing in Australia